Jules Renard (Paris, 1813 – Sèvres 1877) was a 19th-century French playwright and vaudevilliste.

Works 
 Cherubin ou la journée des aventures, comedy in five acts and six tableaux, premiered in Paris at the Théâtre des Délassements-Comiques, 15 September 1852, Vialat et Cie
 L'Hôtel des haricots, vaudeville in three acts with Delbès, premiered in Paris at the Théâtre de la Gaîté 18 January 1861, Pilloy, s.d.
 Un million dans le ventre, vaudeville in one act, premiered in Paris at the Théâtre des Variétés, 17 May 1857, M. Lévy, s.d.
 Même maison, vaudeville in 1 act, Théâtre du Palais-Royal, 4 May 1865, E. Dentu, 1865
 Une noce sur le carré, comédie-vaudeville in one act, Palais-Royal, 6 April 1868, E. Dentu, 1868
 Deux prisonniers de Théodoros, pochade abyssinienne in one act, new music by M. de Villebichot, E. Dentu, 1868
 Le Musée d'Anatole, vaudeville in one act, Palais-Royal, 17 August 1870, E. Dentu, 1871
 Un coup de vent, vaudeville in one act, Palais-Royal, 22 August 1867, E. Dentu, 1872
 La Clarinette postale, comédie-vaudeville in one act, Palais-Royal, 20 June 1873, Tresse, 1873

References 

19th-century French dramatists and playwrights
Writers from Paris
1813 births
1877 deaths